Bukit Bendera is a populated area in Tutong, the town of Tutong District, Brunei. It is officially a village-level subdivision under the mukim or subdistrict of Pekan Tutong, as well as a designated postcode area with the postcode TA1341. Parts of Bukit Bendera area is also under the spatial jurisdiction of Tutong Municipal Department, the municipal body of the town.

References 

Bukit Bendera